Taymasovo (Taymaś) is a rural locality (a selo) in Taymasovsky Selsoviet, Kuyurgazinsky District, Bashkortostan, Russia. The population was 313 as of 2010. There are 3 streets.

Geography 
Taymasovo is located 36 km northwest of Yermolayevo (the district's administrative centre) by road. Novotaymasovo is the nearest rural locality.

References 

Rural localities in Kuyurgazinsky District